Ardit is an Albanian given name for males meaning "gold-day." People named Ardit include:

 Ardit Beqiri, Albanian footballer
 Ardit Gjebrea, Albanian singer
 Ardit Jaupaj, Albanian footballer 
 Ardit Krymi, Albanian footballer
 Ardit Shehaj, Albanian footballer
 Ardit Krymi, Albanian footballer
 Ardit Pasholli, Albanian footballer
 Ardit Kola, Albanian barber

Notes

Albanian masculine given names